Boris Aleksandrovich Mamyrin (25 May 1919  5 March 2007) was a Soviet scientist best known for his invention of the electrostatic ion mirror mass spectrometer known as the reflectron.

Biography
Mamyrin was born in 1919 in Lipetsk, Soviet Russia during Russian civil war. Both of his parents were medical doctors and his early aim was to follow in their footsteps. However, shortly after he obtained his M.S. degree in physics from the Leningrad Polytechnic Institute, World War II cut his studies short. He served in the army throughout the war, finally discharging from military service in 1948. He returned to the Polytechnic Institute and obtained his doctoral degree within a year. He was the head and leading research scientist of the laboratory for mass spectrometry at Ioffe Physico-Technical Institute of the Russian Academy of  Sciences. He was a corresponding member of the Russian Academy of Sciences and a full member of the Russian Academy of Natural Sciences.

See also
Time-of-flight mass spectrometry

References

External links 

Soviet inventors
Soviet physicists
Mass spectrometrists
2007 deaths
1919 births